Ilybius fenestratus is a species of beetle found in many countries in Europe. It was first described by Johan Christian Fabricius in 1781.

The scent gland of this species of beetle is natural source for the anabolic steroid boldenone (Δ1-testosterone).

References

 

fenestratus
Beetles described in 1781